Dorset HealthCare University NHS Foundation Trust provides community and mental health services across Dorset. It serves a population of almost 700,000 people, employing around 5,000 staff. The Trust's income is approximately £242.5 million.

Estate
The Trust has a large and geographically broad estate, operating from over 200 sites ranging from community hospitals to single rooms within premises of other NHS providers. It includes a wide range of different properties, from small to medium-sized mental health in-patient hospitals to single ward community hospitals located in market towns. The Trust participated in an Enhancing the Healing Environment project with the King's Fund to encourage greater use of dining, social and garden areas in St Brelades Ward, Alderney Hospital, Poole.

The trust runs 12 community hospitals and minor injuries units - as well as providing adult and children's community and mental health services, specialist learning disability services, community brain injury services, addiction services and eating disorders services. Its community health services encompass: district nurses, health visitors, school nursing, end of life care, sexual health promotion, safeguarding children, diabetes education, audiology, speech and language therapy, dermatology, podiatry, orthopaedic, wheelchair services and breastfeeding support services. As well as services in Dorset, the Trust also provides some services in Devon and the city of Southampton. Most are provided in local communities, people's homes, local centres and community hospitals. It also provides specialist assessment and treatment inpatient centres.

In November 2021 the trust started building an inpatient eating disorders unit at St Ann's Hospital in Sandbanks with eight inpatient beds and two high-dependency beds.

Regulation
It became a foundation trust on 1 April 2007 and is regulated by Monitor.  The Trust is also registered with the Care Quality Commission.

Monitor found the trust to be in breach of its licence for taking too long to make legally binding changes agreed in April 2013 to properly address quality of care issues raised by the Care Quality Commission and for failing to ensure appropriate staffing levels. In July 2014 Monitor reported that its concerns had been addressed.

In January 2014 the Trust admitted that it has been failing standards on same sex accommodation for more than two years, despite reporting compliance.

In April 2015 it was reported that this was the only Foundation Trust in England where persistently more than 7.5 per cent of its beds are occupied by a patient whose transfer has been delayed, this being one of Monitor's targets.  The trust said: "This [performance] is in a context of a very real shortage of nursing or residential placements, exacerbated by the closure of two independent care homes due to quality concerns that removed 71 beds from the local system."

In July 2019, the Trust was rated Outstanding by the Care Quality Commission.

Leadership
The director of nursing, Paul Lumsden, resigned in March 2014 after less than three months in the post. The chair and chief executive also resigned after intervention by Monitor (NHS) and were replaced on an interim basis by Sir David Henshaw and Ron Shields respectively. Former parliamentary health service ombudsman Ann Abraham was appointed as permanent chair from 7 April.   Eugine Yafele, a former mental health nurse, was appointed chief executive in December 2018. In 2022 he moved to University Hospitals Bristol and Weston NHS Foundation Trust as chief executive.  He was the top of the Health Service Journal ranking of NHS chief executives. 

The Trust spent nearly £650,000 on an external PR and marketing firm, Southampton-based Grayling PR from 2008 to 2014. In 2014/5 the trust will spend more than £104,000 on services provided by the firm.  Its total PR and marketing budget for the current year is £177,000, but that does not take into account the salaries of its own communications staff.   Nicola Plumb, director for organisational development, participation and corporate affairs at the trust, is in charge of communications and is paid nearly £100,000 a year.

See also

 Healthcare in Dorset
 List of NHS trusts

References

External links
 

NHS foundation trusts
NHS mental health trusts
2007 establishments in England
Health in Dorset